Butter is a dairy product made from the fat and protein components of churned cream. It is a semi-solid emulsion at room temperature, consisting of approximately 80% butterfat. It is used at room temperature as a spread, melted as a condiment, and used as a fat in baking, sauce-making, pan frying, and other cooking procedures.

Most frequently made from cow's milk, butter can also be manufactured from the milk of other mammals, including sheep, goats, buffalo, and yaks. It is made by churning milk or cream to separate the fat globules from the buttermilk. Salt has been added to butter since antiquity to help to preserve it, particularly when being transported; salt may still play a preservation role but is less important today as the entire supply chain is usually refrigerated. In modern times salt may be added for its taste. Food colorings are sometimes added to butter. Rendering butter, removing the water and milk solids, produces clarified butter or ghee, which is almost entirely butterfat.

Butter is a water-in-oil emulsion resulting from an inversion of the cream, where the milk proteins are the emulsifiers. It generally has a pale yellow color, but varies from deep yellow to nearly white. Its natural, unmodified color is dependent on the source animal's feed and genetics, but the commercial manufacturing process sometimes alters this with food colorings like annatto or carotene.

Etymology

The word butter derives (via Germanic languages) from the Latin butyrum, which is the latinisation of the Greek βούτυρον (bouturon). This may be a compound of βοῦς (bous), "ox, cow" + τυρός (turos), "cheese", that is "cow-cheese". The word turos ("cheese") is attested in Mycenaean Greek. The latinized form is found in the name butyric acid, a compound found in rancid butter and dairy products such as Parmesan cheese.

Production

Unhomogenized milk and cream contain butterfat in microscopic globules. These globules are surrounded by membranes made of phospholipids (fatty acid emulsifiers) and proteins, which prevent the fat in milk from pooling together into a single mass. Butter is produced by agitating cream, which damages these membranes and allows the milk fats to conjoin, separating from the other parts of the cream. Variations in the production method will create butters with different consistencies, mostly due to the butterfat composition in the finished product. Butter contains fat in three separate forms: free butterfat, butterfat crystals, and undamaged fat globules. In the finished product, different proportions of these forms result in different consistencies within the butter; butters with many crystals are harder than butters dominated by free fats.

Churning produces small butter grains floating in the water-based portion of the cream. This watery liquid is called buttermilk—although the buttermilk most commonly sold today is instead a directly fermented skimmed milk. The buttermilk is drained off; sometimes more buttermilk is removed by rinsing the grains with water. Then the grains are "worked": pressed and kneaded together. When prepared manually, this is done using wooden boards called scotch hands. This consolidates the butter into a solid mass and breaks up embedded pockets of buttermilk or water into tiny droplets.

Commercial butter is about 80% butterfat and 15% water; traditionally-made butter may have as little as 65% fat with 30% water. Butterfat is a mixture of triglyceride, a triester derived from glycerol and three of any of several fatty acid groups.

Types

Before modern factory butter making, cream was usually collected from several milkings and was therefore several days old and somewhat fermented by the time it was made into butter. Butter made from a fermented cream is known as cultured butter. During fermentation, the cream naturally sours as bacteria convert milk sugars into lactic acid. The fermentation process produces additional aroma compounds, including diacetyl, which makes for a fuller-flavored and more "buttery" tasting product. 

Dairy products are often pasteurized during production to kill pathogenic bacteria and other microbes. Butter made from pasteurized fresh cream is called sweet cream butter. Production of sweet cream butter first became common in the 19th century, with the development of refrigeration and the mechanical cream separator. 

Cultured butter is preferred throughout continental Europe, while sweet cream butter dominates in the United States and the United Kingdom. Cultured butter is sometimes labeled "European-style" butter in the United States, although cultured butter is made and sold by some, especially Amish, dairies. Commercial raw cream butter is virtually unheard of in the United States. Raw cream butter is generally only found made at home by consumers who have purchased raw whole milk directly from dairy farmers, skimmed the cream themselves, and made butter with it. It is also rare in Europe.

Clarified butter 

Clarified butter has almost all of its water and milk solids removed, leaving almost-pure butterfat. Clarified butter is made by heating butter to its melting point and then allowing it to cool; after settling, the remaining components separate by density. At the top, whey proteins form a skin, which is removed. The resulting butterfat is then poured off from the mixture of water and casein proteins that settle to the bottom.

Ghee is clarified butter that has been heated to around 120 °C (250 °F) after the water evaporated, turning the milk solids brown. This process flavors the ghee, and also produces antioxidants that help protect it from rancidity. Because of this, ghee can be kept for six to eight months under normal conditions.

Whey butter
Cream may be separated (usually by a centrifuge or a sedimentation) from whey instead of milk, as a byproduct of cheese-making. Whey butter may be made from whey cream. Whey cream and butter have a lower fat content and taste more salty, tangy and "cheesy". They are also cheaper to make than "sweet" cream and butter. The fat content of whey is low, so 1000 pounds of whey will typically give only three pounds of butter.

European butters
There are several butters produced in Europe with protected geographical indications; these include:
 Beurre d'Ardenne, from Belgium
 Beurre d'Isigny, from France
 Beurre Charentes-Poitou (Which also includes: Beurre des Charentes and Beurre des Deux-Sèvres under the same classification), from France
 Beurre Rose, from Luxembourg
 Mantequilla de Soria, from Spain
 Mantega de l'Alt Urgell i la Cerdanya, from Spain
 Rucava white butter (Rucavas baltais sviests), from Latvia

History

Elaine Khosrova traces the invention of butter back to Neolithic-era Africa 8,000 B.C in her book. A later Sumerian tablet, dating to approximately 2,500 B.C., describes the butter making process, from the milking of cattle, while contemporary Sumerian tablets identify butter as a ritual offering.

In the Mediterranean climate, unclarified butter spoils quickly, unlike cheese, so it is not a practical method of preserving the nutrients of milk. The ancient Greeks and Romans seemed to have considered butter a food fit more for the northern barbarians. A play by the Greek comic poet Anaxandrides refers to Thracians as boutyrophagoi, "butter-eaters". In his Natural History, Pliny the Elder calls butter "the most delicate of food among barbarous nations" and goes on to describe its medicinal properties. Later, the physician Galen also described butter as a medicinal agent only.

Middle Ages

In the cooler climates of northern Europe, people could store butter longer before it spoiled. Scandinavia has the oldest tradition in Europe of butter export trade, dating at least to the 12th century. After the fall of Rome and through much of the Middle Ages, butter was a common food across most of Europe—but had a low reputation, and so was consumed principally by peasants. Butter slowly became more accepted by the upper class, notably when the Roman Catholic Church allowed its consumption during Lent from the early 16th century. Bread and butter became common fare among the middle class and the English, in particular, gained a reputation for their liberal use of melted butter as a sauce with meat and vegetables.

In antiquity, butter was used for fuel in lamps, as a substitute for oil. The Butter Tower of Rouen Cathedral was erected in the early 16th century when Archbishop Georges d'Amboise authorized the burning of butter during Lent, instead of oil, which was scarce at the time.

Across northern Europe, butter was sometimes packed into barrels (firkins) and buried in peat bogs, perhaps for years. Such "bog butter" would develop a strong flavor as it aged, but remain edible, in large part because of the cool, airless, antiseptic and acidic environment of a peat bog. Firkins of such buried butter are a common archaeological find in Ireland; the National Museum of Ireland – Archaeology has some containing "a grayish cheese-like substance, partially hardened, not much like butter, and quite free from putrefaction." The practice was most common in Ireland in the 11th–14th centuries; it ended entirely before the 19th century.

Industrialization
Until the 19th century, the vast majority of butter was made by hand, on farms. Butter also provided extra income to farm families. They used wood presses with carved decoration to press butter into pucks or small bricks to sell at nearby markets or general stores. The decoration identified the farm that produced the butter.  This practice continued until production was mechanized and butter was produced in less decorative stick form.  

Like Ireland, France became well known for its butter, particularly in Normandy and Brittany. Butter consumption in London in the mid 1840s was estimated at 15,357 tons annually. 

The first butter factories appeared in the United States in the early 1860s, after the successful introduction of cheese factories a decade earlier. In the late 1870s, the centrifugal cream separator was introduced, marketed most successfully by Swedish engineer Carl Gustaf Patrik de Laval. 

In 1920, Otto Hunziker authored The Butter Industry, Prepared for Factory, School and Laboratory, a well-known text in the industry that enjoyed at least three editions (1920, 1927, 1940). As part of the efforts of the American Dairy Science Association, Professor Hunziker and others published articles regarding: causes of tallowiness (an odor defect, distinct from rancidity, a taste defect); mottles (an aesthetic issue related to uneven color); introduced salts; the impact of creamery metals and liquids; and acidity measurement. These and other ADSA publications helped standardize practices internationally.

Butter consumption declined in most western nations during the 20th century, mainly because of the rising popularity of margarine, which is less expensive and, until recent years, was perceived as being healthier. In the United States, margarine consumption overtook butter during the 1950s, and it is still the case today that more margarine than butter is eaten in the U.S. and the EU.

Worldwide production

In 1997, India produced  of butter, most of which was consumed domestically. Second in production was the United States, followed by France, Germany, and New Zealand. France ranks first in per capita butter consumption with 8 kg per capita per year. In terms of absolute consumption, Germany was second after India, using  of butter in 1997, followed by France, Russia, and the United States. New Zealand, Australia, Denmark and Ukraine are among the few nations that export a significant percentage of the butter they produce.

Different varieties are found around the world. Smen is a spiced Moroccan clarified butter, buried in the ground and aged for months or years. A similar product is maltash of the Hunza Valley, where cow and yak butter can be buried for decades, and is used at events such as weddings. Yak butter is a specialty in Tibet; tsampa, barley flour mixed with yak butter, is a staple food. Butter tea is consumed in the Himalayan regions of Tibet, Bhutan, Nepal and India. It consists of tea served with intensely flavored—or "rancid"—yak butter and salt. In African and Asian nations, butter is sometimes traditionally made from sour milk rather than cream. It can take several hours of churning to produce workable butter grains from fermented milk.

Storage

Normal butter softens to a spreadable consistency around 15 °C (60 °F), well above refrigerator temperatures. The "butter compartment" found in many refrigerators may be one of the warmer sections inside, but it still leaves butter quite hard. Until recently, many refrigerators sold in New Zealand featured a "butter conditioner", a compartment kept warmer than the rest of the refrigerator—but still cooler than room temperature—with a small heater. Keeping butter tightly wrapped delays rancidity, which is hastened by exposure to light or air, and also helps prevent it from picking up other odors. Wrapped butter has a shelf life of several months at refrigerator temperatures. Butter can also be frozen to extend its storage life.

Packaging

United States
In the United States, butter has traditionally been made into small, rectangular blocks by means of a pair of wooden butter paddles. It is usually produced in  sticks that are individually wrapped in waxed or foiled paper, and sold as a  package of 4 sticks. This practice is believed to have originated in 1907, when Swift and Company began packaging butter in this manner for mass distribution.
Due to historical differences in butter printers (machines that cut and package butter), 4-ounce sticks are commonly produced in two different shapes:

 The dominant shape east of the Rocky Mountains is the Elgin, or Eastern-pack shape, named for a dairy in Elgin, Illinois. The sticks measure  and are typically sold stacked two by two in elongated cube-shaped boxes.
 West of the Rocky Mountains, butter printers standardized on a different shape that is now referred to as the Western-pack shape.  These butter sticks measure  and are usually sold with four sticks packed side-by-side in a flat, rectangular box.

Most butter dishes are designed for Elgin-style butter sticks.

Elsewhere

Bulk packaging

Since the 1940s, but more commonly the 1960s, butter pats have been individually wrapped and packed in cardboard boxes. Prior to use of cardboard, butter was bulk packed in wood. The earliest discoveries used firkins. From about 1882 wooden boxes were used, as the introduction of refrigeration on ships brought about longer transit times. Butter boxes were generally made with woods whose resin would not taint the butter, such as sycamore,  kahikatea, hoop pine, maple, or spruce. They commonly weighed a firkin - .

In cooking and gastronomy

Butter has been considered indispensable in French cuisine since the 17th century. Chefs and cooks have extolled its importance: Fernand Point said "Donnez-moi du beurre, encore du beurre, toujours du beurre!" ('Give me butter, more butter, still more butter!'); Julia Child said "With enough butter, anything is good."

Melted butter plays an important role in the preparation of sauces, notably in French cuisine. Beurre noisette (hazelnut butter) and Beurre noir (black butter) are sauces of melted butter cooked until the milk solids and sugars have turned golden or dark brown; they are often finished with an addition of vinegar or lemon juice. Hollandaise and béarnaise sauces are emulsions of egg yolk and melted butter. Hollandaise and béarnaise sauces are stabilized with the powerful emulsifiers in the egg yolks, but butter itself contains enough emulsifiers—mostly remnants of the fat globule membranes—to form a stable emulsion on its own. 

Beurre blanc (white butter) is made by whisking butter into reduced vinegar or wine, forming an emulsion with the texture of thick cream. Beurre monté (prepared butter) is melted but still emulsified butter; it lends its name to the practice of "mounting" a sauce with butter: whisking cold butter into any water-based sauce at the end of cooking, giving the sauce a thicker body and a glossy shine—as well as a buttery taste.

Butter is used for sautéing and frying, although its milk solids brown and burn above 150 °C (250 °F)—a rather low temperature for most applications. The smoke point of butterfat is around 200 °C (400 °F), so clarified butter or ghee is better suited to frying. 

Butter fills several roles in baking, where it is used in a similar manner to other solid fats like lard, suet, or shortening, but has a flavor that may better complement sweet baked goods.

Nutritional information

As butter is essentially just the milk fat, it contains only traces of lactose, so moderate consumption of butter is not a problem for lactose intolerant people. People with milk allergies may still need to avoid butter, which contains enough of the allergy-causing proteins to cause reactions. Whole milk, butter and cream have high levels of saturated fat.

Health concerns
A 2015 study concluded that "hypercholesterolemic people should keep their consumption of butter to a minimum, whereas moderate butter intake may be considered part of the diet in the normocholesterolemic population."

A meta-analysis and systematic review published in 2016 found relatively small or insignificant overall associations of a dose of 14g/day of butter with mortality and CVD, and consumption was insignificantly inversely associated with incidence of diabetes. The study states that "findings do not support a need for major emphasis in dietary guidelines on either increasing or decreasing butter consumption."

See also
 List of butter dishes
 List of dairy products
 List of butter sauces
 List of spreads

References

Further reading

  pp. 33–39, "Butter and Margarine"
 
 Michael Douma (editor). WebExhibits' Butter pages . Retrieved 21 November 2005.
  Full text online 
 Grigg, David B. (7 November 1974). The Agricultural Systems of the World: An Evolutionary Approach , 196–198. Google Print.  (accessed 28 November 2005). Also available in print from Cambridge University Press.

External links

 Manufacture of butter, The University of Guelph
 "Butter", Food Resource, College of Health and Human Sciences, Oregon State University, 20 February 2007. – FAQ, links, and extensive bibliography of food science articles on butter.
 Cork Butter Museum: the story of Ireland’s most important food export and the world’s largest butter market
 Virtual Museum Exhibit on Milk, Cream & Butter

 
Dairy products
Cooking fats
Colloids
Spreads (food)
Condiments